The Ambassador Extraordinary and Plenipotentiary of Turkey to Canada is the official representative of the President and the Government of Turkey to the Prime Minister and the Government of Canada.

The ambassador and their staff work at large in the Embassy of Turkey in Ottawa. There are Consulate Generals in Montreal, Toronto and Vancouver.

The post of Turkish Ambassador to Canada is currently held by Kerim Uras, incumbent since December 17, 2018.

Ambassadors 
 Coşkun Kırca (1985-1986)
 Taha Carım (1961-1965)

References 

 
Canada
Turkey